Johnny Albertsen (born 13 August 1977 in Gentofte) is an alpine skier from Denmark.  He competed for Denmark at the 2010 Winter Olympics.
His best result was a 40th place in the super-G.

References

External links

1977 births
Danish male alpine skiers
Alpine skiers at the 1994 Winter Olympics
Alpine skiers at the 2010 Winter Olympics
Olympic alpine skiers of Denmark
People from Gentofte Municipality
Living people
Sportspeople from the Capital Region of Denmark